Lebo is a surname. Notable people with the surname include:

António Lebo Lebo (born 1977), Angolan footballer
Brad Lebo (born 1970), American football player
Jeff Lebo (born 1966), American basketball coach
John Gaul Lebo (born 1972), Nigerian lawyer and politician
Lauri Lebo (born 1964), American journalist